The 2017–18 North Carolina A&T Aggies women's basketball team represents North Carolina Agricultural and Technical State University during the 2017–18 NCAA Division I women's basketball season. The Aggies, led by sixth year head coach Tarrell Robinson, play their home games at the Corbett Sports Center in Greensboro, North Carolina as members of the Mid-Eastern Athletic Conference. They finished the season 23–9, 15–1 in MEAC play win the MEAC regular season title with Bethune–Cookman. They won the MEAC women's tournament and earn an received automatic bid of the NCAA women's tournament where they lost to South Carolina in the first round.

Roster

Schedule and results

|-
!colspan=9 style=| Non-conference regular season

|-
!colspan=9 style=| MEAC regular season

|-
!colspan=9 style=| MEAC Women's Tournament

|-
!colspan=9 style=| NCAA Women's Tournament

See also
2017–18 North Carolina A&T Aggies men's basketball team

References

North Carolina A&T Aggies women's basketball seasons
North Carolina AandT
2018 in sports in North Carolina
2017 in sports in North Carolina
North Carolina AandT